Rock Springs may refer to:

In places:
 Rock Springs, Missouri
 Rock Springs, New Mexico
 Rock Springs, Wisconsin
 Rock Springs, Wyoming
 Rock Springs–Sweetwater County Airport, Wyoming
 Rock Springs Conservation Area, Illinois
 Rock Springs Run State Reserve, Florida

In other uses:
 Rock Springs (book), a 1987 collection of short stories by Richard Ford
 Rock Springs massacre, an 1885 riot in Wyoming among white and Chinese immigrant miners